Siege of Trebizond may refer to:

 Siege of Trebizond (1205–1206), a siege by the Seljuq Turks
 Siege of Trebizond (1222–1223), a siege by the Seljuq Turks
 Siege of Trebizond (1282), a siege by the Georgians
 Siege of Trebizond (1461), a siege by the Ottoman Turks